Crystal Theater is a historic theater in Okemah, Oklahoma. It was built in 1921 and has hosted the Woody Guthrie Folk Festival.

References

Theatres in Oklahoma
Buildings and structures in Okfuskee County, Oklahoma
Theatres completed in 1921